Following is a list of senators of Sarthe, people who have represented the department of Sarthe in the Senate of France.

Third Republic

Senators for Sarthe under the French Third Republic were:

 Eugène Caillaux (1876–1882)
 Auguste de Talhouët-Roy (1876–1882)
 Michel Vétillart (1876–1882)
 Louis Cordelet (1882–1923)
 Pierre Le Monnier (1882–1895) 
 Anselme Rubillard (1882–1891)
 Alphonse Le Porché (1891–1902)
 Prosper Legludic (1895–1904)
 Georges Le Chevalier (1903–1909)
 Paul Henri Balluet d'Estournelles de Constant  (1904–1924)
 André Lebert (1909–1942)
 Pierre Ajam (1924–1927)
 Édouard Gigon (1924–1925)
 Joseph Caillaux (1925–1944)
 Almire Breteau (1927–1930)
 René Buquin (1930–1936)
 Albert Thibault (1936–1940)

Fourth Republic

Senators for Sarthe under the French Fourth Republic were:

 Max Boyer (1946–1948)
 Jean de Montgascon (1946–1948)
 Jean-Yves Chapalain (1948–1958)
 Raymond Dronne (1948–1951)
 Philippe d'Argenlieu (1951–1959) Rally of the French People (RPF)

Fifth Republic 
Senators for Sarthe under the French Fifth Republic:

References

Sources

 
Lists of members of the Senate (France) by department